The MV Tillikum is the sole remaining  operated by Washington State Ferries (WSF) and the oldest ferry operating in the WSF system.

The Tillikum entered service in April 1959 for the Seattle–Bainbridge Island route. Upon the delivery of the  ferries in 1968, the Tillikum was moved to the Edmonds-Kingston run where it remained until approximately 1980. After being displaced by the  ferry  in the early 1980s, the Tillikum spent roughly a decade as a relief boat before settling on the Fauntleroy-Vashon-Southworth run in the early 1990s. Since the retirement of her sister  in 2017, she has been serving primarily as the San Juan Inter-island vessel.

References

Washington State Ferries vessels
1959 ships